Batuhampar is a village at Kab 50 Kota near Payakumbuh City in West Sumatra.

Populated places in West Sumatra